Karen Khachanov was the defending champion, but lost in the quarterfinals to Andreas Seppi.

Andrey Rublev won the title, defeating Adrian Mannarino in the final, 6–4, 6–0.

Seeds
The top four seeds received a bye into the second round.

Draw

Finals

Top half

Bottom half

Qualifying

Seeds

Qualifiers

Lucky loser
  Nikola Milojević

Qualifying draw

First qualifier

Second qualifier

Third qualifier

Fourth qualifier

References

External links
 Main draw
 Qualifying draw

Kremlin Cup - Singles
2019 Men's Singles